Sven Alkalaj (born 11 November 1948) is a Bosnian diplomat and the current Permanent Representative of Bosnia and Herzegovina to the United Nations. He also served as the country's Minister of Foreign Affairs from 2007 until 2012. Alkalaj held the post of executive secretary of UNECE between 2012 and 2014 as well.

He served as the first Bosnia and Herzegovina Ambassador to the United States during the 1990s. Alkalaj is one of the most prominent Bosnian Jews of Sephardic origin and is a longtime member of the Party for Bosnia and Herzegovina (SBiH).

Early life and education
Alkalaj was born to a Sephardic Jewish father and a Bosnian Croat Catholic mother. The Alkalaj are a prominent Bosnian Jewish family, who settled in Sarajevo up to five hundreds of years ago when they fled the Spanish Inquisition. 
He was raised Jewish.

Alkalaj graduated in mechanical engineering from the University of Sarajevo in 1974. He returned to the university and in 1987 earned a degree in international relations and economics, with a focus on Latin America.

In 2016, he was awarded a PhD in International Relations and International Law by the University of Travnik, with a dissertation on the "Policy of the United Nations Security Council in the Process of International Recognition and Peace-Building in Bosnia and Herzegovina (1992–2010)".

Managerial career
From 1975 until 1985, Alkalaj worked at Petrolinvest as a commercial manager in Sarajevo. He would later work at Energoinvest, firstly as a regional manager for the Middle and Far East in Sarajevo from 1985 until 1988, and then as a managing director in Bangkok, Thailand from 1988 until 1994.

Diplomatic career

Following the breakup of Yugoslavia and the independence of Bosnia and Herzegovina in 1992, from 23 June 1994 until 14 June 2000, Alkalaj served as the first Ambassador of Bosnia and Herzegovina to the United States in Washington, D.C., also accredited to the Organization of American States from 2000 to 2003. In 1999, Alkalaj also attended the Executive Development Program and Corporate Finance Program of Harvard University's Graduate School of Business Administration.

From 2004 until 2007, Alkalaj was posted in Brussels as the Ambassador of Bosnia and Herzegovina to Belgium and the Head of Mission of Bosnia and Herzegovina to the North Atlantic Treaty Organization (NATO).

From 11 January 2007 until 12 January 2012, Alkalaj served as Minister of Foreign Affairs in the first and second cabinets of Nikola Špirić, representing the Party for Bosnia and Herzegovina (SBiH), then led by Haris Silajdžić. As Minister of Foreign Affairs, Alkalaj was criticised and even his resignation was demanded in 2007 after it was published in Bosnian media that he had taken Croatian citizenship in 2006 based upon his mother's lineage. He was later charged by prosecutors in a case before the Court of Bosnia and Herzegovina with misconduct in his office as Minister of Foreign Affairs, related to his "signing off on a cash award of 13,418.59 KM to his then deputy Ana Trišić-Babić for her work at the Council of Ministers NATO coordination team."

From 8 March 2012 to 8 April 2014, Alkalaj was the executive secretary of the United Nations Economic Commission for Europe (UNECE) in Geneva.

He also served as a visiting professor at the Geneva School of Diplomacy and International Relations between 2015 and 2019, as well as an assistant professor at the University of Travnik from 2016 until 2017.

On 5 July 2019, Alkalaj was appointed by Bosnian Presidency member Željko Komšić as a Permanent Representative of Bosnia and Herzegovina to the United Nations in New York City.

References

External links

Official website of the Ministry of Foreign affairs of Bosnia and Herzegovina 

1948 births
Living people
Diplomats from Sarajevo
Bosnia and Herzegovina Sephardi Jews
Bosnia and Herzegovina people of Croatian descent
Bosnia and Herzegovina people of Spanish descent
Naturalized citizens of Croatia
People of Spanish-Jewish descent
University of Sarajevo alumni
Heads of mission of Bosnia and Herzegovina to NATO
Party for Bosnia and Herzegovina politicians
Foreign ministers of Bosnia and Herzegovina
Ambassadors of Bosnia and Herzegovina to the United States
Permanent Representatives of Bosnia and Herzegovina to the United Nations